The 1977 PBA season was the third season of the Philippine Basketball Association (PBA).

Season highlights
The league's third season started on April 17 and for the first time, three referees were called to officiate the games. The opening game between Crispa and Toyota, where the Redmanizers edged out the Tamaraws, 122–121, was marred by a post-game rumble involving players from both teams that erupted at the Araneta Coliseum hardcourt and extended to the dugout. The brawl resulted in the arrest and booking of all 13 Crispa and 10 Toyota players at the stockade of Camp Crame where they were held for 13 hours. PBA Commissioner Leo Prieto fined both teams P5,000 each for that melee. 
On July 12, Mariwasa beats Toyota, 121–114, to set the stage for the first non Crispa-Toyota title-showdown.
Crispa wins the All-Filipino crown and their fifth consecutive championship by defeating Mariwasa-Honda Panthers. The Redmanizers continued its dynasty and a quest for another grandslam by winning its sixth straight title, defeating U/Tex Wranglers for the Open crown. 
Toyota Tamaraws ended Crispa's reign by winning the Invitational championship, sweeping Emtex Sacronel (Palmeiras) of Brazil, bannered by Oscar Schmidt, to complete the first ever 3–0 finals sweep in PBA history. Also seeing action in that conference were the Ramrod Blocks (Melbourne Panthers) of Australia.

All-star games
On August 7, Trust beats More, 135–124, to win the P82,000 battle of PBA superstars at the Araneta Coliseum on a 2–1 score. Players for Trust were Rudolf Kutch, Rosalio Martirez, Jun Papa, Jesse Sullano, Estoy Estrada, Romy Cabading, Danilo Basilan, Atoy Co, Philip Cezar, Bernie Fabiosa, Freddie Hubalde and Rudy Soriano, while the More line-up were consist of Manny Paner, Jimmy Mariano, Freddie Webb, Jaime Taguines, Larry Mumar, Johnny Revilla, Robert Jaworski, Francis Arnaiz, Ramon Fernandez, Jess Sta. Maria and Abe King.

Champions
 All-Filipino Conference: Crispa Redmanizers
 Open Conference: Crispa Redmanizers
 Invitational Championship: Toyota Tamaraws
 Team with best win–loss percentage: Crispa Redmanizers (49–15, .766)
 Best Team of the Year: Crispa Redmanizers (2nd)

Individual awards
 Most Valuable Player: Freddie Hubalde (Crispa)
 Rookie of the Year: Jimmy Taguines (Tanduay)
 Mythical Five:
Robert Jaworski (Toyota)
Atoy Co (Crispa)
Ramon Fernandez (Toyota)
Freddie Hubalde (Crispa)
Adriano Papa, Jr. (Mariwasa)

Cumulative standings

References

 
PBA